HMNZS Canterbury is a multi-role vessel (MRV) of the Royal New Zealand Navy. She was commissioned in June 2007, and is the second ship of the Royal New Zealand Navy to carry the name. She is also New Zealand's first purpose-built strategic sealift ship.

Planning and design

As early as 1988 the Royal New Zealand Navy had identified the need for some form of sealift in the South Pacific. The subsequent failure of successive governments to fund the required refits resulted in Charles Upham being sold in 2001.

At the same time the newly elected Labour Government directed the navy to exclude the option of a third frigate from the Maritime Forces Review, while the sea lift requirement was also part of a wider capability mix desired.

Construction
The construction of the MRV was sub-contracted to Merwede Shipyards in the Netherlands by Tenix Shipyards in Williamstown, Melbourne, with the design based on the commercial RoRo ship Ben my Chree. However, the choice of a commercially based design has been criticised after the ship was delivered, as it placed several limitations on the functionality of the ship in rough seas – rather than the coastal environment for which Ben my Chree was designed.

The keel was laid on 6 September 2005 and the MRV was launched successfully on 11 February 2006. The ship completed initial sea trials in the Netherlands and arrived in Australia in late August 2006 for fit-out with military equipment. Final acceptance was delayed due to alterations to the ship's hospital and late delivery of documentation. There were also ongoing concerns, negotiations and redesign activities regarding her performance in heavy seas, doubts about which had already been thrown up during her initial journey to Australia, and in fact, even before actual construction.

The MRV was accepted by the New Zealand Government on 31 May 2007 and commissioned on 12 June 2007 in Port Melbourne, Australia by the Prime Minister of New Zealand, Helen Clark. The ship cost NZ$130 million to construct.

She was constructed with an ice-strengthened hull to allow her to operate in the subantarctic waters, where New Zealand governs several islands, and where Canterbury is to assist scientific expeditions.

The vessel was plagued by problems since delivery, having been involved in a number of incidents and being considered less seaworthy than specified. It was estimated in 2008 that at least another NZ$20 million would have to be spent to achieve the sought-for operational abilities.

Operational history

Initial exercises and operations

After commissioning, the ship sailed to its home port of Lyttelton arriving 28 June 2007. After several days of inaugural events, it departed again on 2 July. Following a courtesy visit to Timaru and after a month-long set of trials and exercises in the Auckland area, where she is operationally based at Devonport Naval Base, she is to head to New Zealand's subantarctic waters carrying DOC conservation officers.

In September 2007, Canterbury embarked 250 troops and 50 vehicles, including 20 NZLAV armoured vehicles, to test embarkation and disembarkation procedures.

AU-NZ disaster relief response force
In early 2011, it was announced that the ship would form the core asset of a joint Australia-New Zealand task force for disaster-relief operations. At that time Canterbury was the only vessel available to the navies of the two countries suitable for such tasks as three other similarly capable Australian ships were unavailable due to significant maintenance problems.

Coincidentally, the newly appointed disaster-relief ship was in the port of Lyttelton less than two weeks later during the devastating February 2011 Christchurch earthquake. The crew provided meals for 1,000 people left homeless in that town, and accommodation for a small number of locals.

2012 Kermadec Islands eruption and pumice raft
HMNZS Canterbury was the first ship to take scientific samples from a 7,500–10,000 square mile pumice raft that was discovered in the Kermadec Islands.

2016 Kaikoura earthquake
After the earthquake on 14 November 2016, HMNZS Canterbury was deployed to provide relief for Kaikoura, as extensive damage to major roads severely restricted access. The ship delivered supplies from Port Lyttleton to Kaikoura and evacuated foreign tourists back to Port Lyttleton.

2022 Hunga Tonga eruption and tsunami
On 20 January, New Zealand announced that it would dispatch the HMNZS Canterbury with two NH90 helicopters to assist with relief efforts after the eruption in Tonga, following the earlier deployment of the HMNZS Wellington and HMNZS Aotearoa on 18 January.

Capabilities

Armaments

As a sealift ship, Canterbury is not intended to enter combat, or conduct opposed landings under fire. The ship's armament consists of a single 25 mm M242 Bushmaster cannon fitted to an MSI DS25 stabilised mount, two .50 calibre machine guns, and a number of small arms. These are intended for self-defence against other smaller craft, and for ocean patrol duties (for example the intercepting of suspicious civilian craft) during a naval blockade.

Facilities

Cargo

The indicative cargo would encompass (as one possible loadout): 14 Pinzgauer Light Operational Vehicles, 16 NZLAV light armoured vehicles, 7 Unimog trucks, 2 ambulances, 2 flatbed trucks, 7 vehicle trailers, 2 rough terrain forklifts, 4 ATV-type vehicles and up to 33 20 ft TEU containers.

The ship is equipped to embark up to eight containers of ammunition and up to two with hazardous materials, and also has an extensive fire sprinkler system.

Landing craft

The ship also carries two Landing Craft, Medium. They are operated by a crew of three, using two Azimuth thrusters generating 235 kW.

The LCMs can be loaded from either of Canterburys two 60 tonne cranes or via the stern ramp. To aid stern ramp loading, the MRV is fitted with Flippers to ensure that the LCM are aligned with the MRV. A ballasting system is fitted to allow for safe operations during loading. Once loaded, the LCM can conduct over-the-beach landings, with the boats mainly intended to be able to access beaches in the Pacific where no port facilities are available, for example during humanitarian missions.

Due to various issues (discussed further below) the original landing craft were decided in 2010 to need replacing. The fate of the current craft is currently undecided.

Helicopter facilities
Canterbury is able to accommodate up to four NH90 helicopters for deployment ashore in support of New Zealand Army operations and disaster relief activities. She is also capable of operating the SH-2G Seasprite and the helicopter deck is able to handle a Chinook-size helicopter.

Medical
Canterbury has a five-bed hospital ward, a two-bed sickbay, an operating theatre, a medical laboratory and a morgue.

Others
The ship also contains a gym, workshops, an armoury and magazine, as well as offices for government officials embarked (such as Department of Conservation or NIWA scientists).

Issues
The ship has been plagued by a number of issues, most of them related to faulty design, or design inappropriate for the intended operating conditions.

Problems with RHIBs and landing craft
Canterbury weathered her first strong storm during 10 July 2007 well, though she lost one of her rigid-hulled inflatable boats (RHIB) (and almost lost the other) to waves swamping her open boat bays while near Tauranga on the way to Auckland. The RHIB was found a week later, washed ashore on Great Barrier Island,  to the north.

A court of inquiry found that the loss was due to a known design flaw identified in tank testing. The flaw resulted in the loss of the RHIB and water entering the cargo deck after the doors were opened by the sea. As a result of this the doors were tied shut. The court of inquiry also reported slamming of the bow and propellers leaving the water. Options to resolve the design problems on the ship include closing the alcoves in which the ship's boats had been stowed. The ship's anti-roll system will not function when the period of the ship's roll is less than 11.9 seconds. As a result, work was begun to relocate the boats to a less vulnerable location.

New Zodiac inflatable sea boats were ordered from Tenix Australia to replace the two Gemini sea boats that were damaged.

In 2010, it was decided that two new landing craft would have to be built for Canterbury, as they had experienced a variety of issues, from material problems experienced with weak bow ramps to stability problems, which severely curtailed their usability. The Australian builders of the ship, BAE Systems, agreed to pay $85 million towards remedying the faults of the ship, including the construction of the new landing craft.

In 2013, two new shell doors on deck 3, and two new accommodation ladders on deck 5 were designed and installed by Taranaki engineering firms ITL and EHL. Marine Industrial Design and Babcock NZ made the necessary structural changes. The RHIB was able to be relocated as a result of the innovative design of the new accommodation ladders which can stow compactly inside the ship (5m × 2.5 × 2.5m), rather than being externally stored alongside the ship as before. Improved design of the ladders and the relocation of the RHIB has increased the safety and capability of the ship is no longer compromised.

Sea-keeping performance
In September 2008, an independent review of the safety and functionality of the ship revealed that some operating limitations will have to be accepted, as sea-keeping performance is poor in high sea states. The "selection of a commercial Roll-on, Roll-off (Ro-Ro) design" has "been at the root of differences of opinion between Tenix, the Ministry of Defence and New Zealand Defence Force and the shortfalls in performance". The issues included that the propellers can come out of the water when the ship pitches in rough seas, with concern that this may affect the ship's machinery. The report also recommended relocating the ship's boats (or protecting them from waves if relocation was not possible) and adding more ballast or improving the ballasting system of Canterbury.

These upgrades have now been completed. The RHIB alcoves are now further forward and higher, and more ballast has been added to help with sea keeping. This was all completed before the Pacific Partnership 2013 Exercise.

See also
 Logistic ships of the Royal New Zealand Navy
  (name predecessor)
 Project Protector

References

External links

 HMNZS Canterbury – L421 (official website of the Royal New Zealand Navy)
 Project Protector (from the Royal New Zealand Navy website)
 Phase One: Land Forces and Sealift (from the New Zealand Defence Force Capability Review, November 2000)
 Key Findings (from the Maritime Forces Review, January 2002)

Amphibious warfare vessels of the Royal New Zealand Navy
Sealift ships
Ships built in the Netherlands
2011 Christchurch earthquake
2006 ships